The 1986 CFL season is considered to be the 33rd season in modern-day Canadian football, although it is officially the 29th Canadian Football League season.

CFL News in 1986
The Canadian Football League decided that all nine teams will play 18 games each, in the regular season. The playoff structure was revised to allow a fourth place team from one of the divisions to qualify for the playoffs if that fourth place team has earned more points in the regular season standings than the third place team from the other division. Until 1992, however, that team stayed in its own division for the playoffs (the league began American expansion in 1993, changing the rules along the way). The four qualifiers in one division played semi-finals and a final while the two qualifiers in the other division playing a home-and-home, total-points, 2-game playoff (this playoff format was last used in 1972). This was somewhat unfair to the first place team, who might no longer receive a first-round bye based simply on what happened at the bottom of its own division. (The current format, which began in 1997 after the league ceased its American operations, sees a fourth-place qualifier cross-over to the other division, essentially becoming the third-place team in that division.) As it turned out, 1986 was the only year this playoff format was needed.

The Canadian Football League and the Canadian Football League Players Association agreed on a new three-year agreement.

The Concordes changed their name to the Alouettes, coinciding with the 40th anniversary of the founding of the original Montreal Alouettes.

The Sports Network started to carry live coverage of the first round of the 1986 Canadian College Draft from coast-to-coast.

The Winnipeg Blue Bombers and the Montreal Alouettes played the first CFL pre-season game at Canada Games Stadium in Saint John, New Brunswick. Winnipeg won the game, 35–10.

The CFL also amended the quota to the teams 35-man roster to include 13 imports, 19 non-imports and 3 quarterbacks. The designated import rule was eliminated.

On the field, the end zones were reduced to 20 yards from 25 yards (in response to the popularity of the shortened end zones first used at BC Place in 1983).

The amateur Canadian Football Association changed its name to Football Canada in June; the Football Canada name had long been used in French.

The CTV Television Network ceased CFL broadcasts after this season; it had aired CFL games since 1962. The league-run syndicated Canadian Football Network took its place the next season.

Regular season standings

Final regular season standings
Note: GP = Games Played, W = Wins, L = Losses, T = Ties, PF = Points For, PA = Points Against, Pts = Points

Bold text means that they have clinched the playoffs.

Grey Cup playoffs

The Hamilton Tiger-Cats are the 1986 Grey Cup champions, defeating the Edmonton Eskimos 39–15, at Vancouver's BC Place Stadium. This was Hamilton's first Grey Cup victory since 1972. The Tiger-Cats' Mike Kerrigan (QB) was named the Grey Cup's Most Valuable Player on Offence and Grover Covington (DE) was named Grey Cup's Most Valuable Player on Defence, while Paul Osbaldiston (K/P) was named the Grey Cup's Most Valuable Canadian.

Playoff bracket

Hamilton won their 2 game total-point series against Toronto by outscoring them 59–56. The Tiger-Cats advanced to the Grey Cup Championship game.

CFL Leaders
 CFL Passing Leaders
 CFL Rushing Leaders
 CFL Receiving Leaders

1986 CFL All-Stars

Offence
QB – Rick Johnson, Calgary Stampeders
RB – Gary Allen, Calgary Stampeders
RB – Bobby Johnson, Saskatchewan Roughriders
SB – Joe Poplawski, Winnipeg Blue Bombers
SB – Rocky DiPietro, Hamilton Tiger-Cats
WR – James Murphy, Winnipeg Blue Bombers
WR – James Hood, Montreal Alouettes
C – Bob Poley, Calgary Stampeders
OG – Roger Aldag, Saskatchewan Roughriders
OG – Leo Blanchard, Edmonton Eskimos
OT – Chris Walby, Winnipeg Blue Bombers
OT – Rudy Phillips, Edmonton Eskimos

Defence
DT – Harold Hallman, Calgary Stampeders
DT – Brett Williams, Montreal Alouettes
DE – James "Quick" Parker, BC Lions
DE – Grover Covington, Hamilton Tiger-Cats
LB – Danny Bass, Edmonton Eskimos
LB – Tyrone Jones, Winnipeg Blue Bombers
LB – Willie Pless, Toronto Argonauts
CB – Roy Bennett, Winnipeg Blue Bombers
CB – Less Browne, Hamilton Tiger-Cats
DB – Larry Crawford, BC Lions
DB – Mark Streeter, Hamilton Tiger-Cats
S – Scott Flagel, Winnipeg Blue Bombers

Special teams
P – Hank Ilesic, Toronto Argonauts
K – Lance Chomyc, Toronto Argonauts
ST – Gary Allen, Calgary Stampeders

1986 Eastern All-Stars

Offence
QB – Mike Kerrigan, Hamilton Tiger-Cats
RB – Walter Bender, Hamilton Tiger-Cats
RB – Jim Reid, Ottawa Rough Riders
SB – Mark Barousse, Ottawa Rough Riders
SB – Rocky DiPietro, Hamilton Tiger-Cats
WR – Tony Champion, Hamilton Tiger-Cats
WR – James Hood, Montreal Alouettes
C – Marv Allemang, Hamilton Tiger-Cats
OG – Jason Riley, Hamilton Tiger-Cats
OG – Dan Ferrone, Toronto Argonauts
OT – Lloyd Fairbanks, Montreal Alouettes
OT – Miles Gorrell, Hamilton Tiger-Cats

Defence
DT – Mike Walker, Hamilton Tiger-Cats
DT – Brett Williams, Montreal Alouettes
DE – Rodney Harding, Toronto Argonauts
DE – Grover Covington, Hamilton Tiger-Cats
LB – Ben Zambiasi, Hamilton Tiger-Cats
LB – Leo Ezerins, Hamilton Tiger-Cats
LB – Willie Pless, Toronto Argonauts
CB – Terry Irvin, Montreal Alouettes
CB – Less Browne, Hamilton Tiger-Cats
DB – Carl Brazley, Toronto Argonauts
DB – Mark Streeter, Hamilton Tiger-Cats
S – Rick Ryan, Montreal Alouettes

Special teams
P – Hank Ilesic, Toronto Argonauts
K – Lance Chomyc, Toronto Argonauts
ST – Jeff Treftlin, Montreal Alouettes

1986 Western All-Stars

Offence
QB – Rick Johnson, Calgary Stampeders
RB – Gary Allen, Calgary Stampeders
RB – Bobby Johnson, Saskatchewan Roughriders
SB – Joe Poplawski, Winnipeg Blue Bombers
SB – Emanuel Tolbert, Calgary Stampeders
WR – James Murphy, Winnipeg Blue Bombers
WR – Ray Alexander, Calgary Stampeders
C – Bob Poley, Calgary Stampeders
OG – Roger Aldag, Saskatchewan Roughriders
OG – Leo Blanchard, Edmonton Eskimos
OT – Chris Walby, Winnipeg Blue Bombers
OT – Rudy Phillips, Edmonton Eskimos

Defence
DT – Harold Hallman, Calgary Stampeders
DT – James Zachery, Edmonton Eskimos
DE – James "Quick" Parker, BC Lions
DE – Stewart Hill, Edmonton Eskimos
LB – Danny Bass, Edmonton Eskimos
LB – Tyrone Jones, Winnipeg Blue Bombers
LB – Billy Jackson, Saskatchewan Roughriders
CB – Roy Bennett, Winnipeg Blue Bombers
CB – Mel Jenkins, Calgary Stampeders
DB – Larry Crawford, BC Lions
DB – Richie Hall, Calgary Stampeders
S – Scott Flagel, Winnipeg Blue Bombers

Special teams
P – Tom Dixon, Edmonton Eskimos
K – J. T. Hay, Calgary Stampeders
ST – Gary Allen, Calgary Stampeders

1986 CFL Awards
CFL's Most Outstanding Player Award – James Murphy (WR), Winnipeg Blue Bombers
CFL's Most Outstanding Canadian Award – Joe Poplawski (SB), Winnipeg Blue Bombers
CFL's Most Outstanding Defensive Player Award – James "Quick" Parker (DE), BC Lions
CFL's Most Outstanding Offensive Lineman Award – Roger Aldag (OG), Saskatchewan Roughriders
CFL's Most Outstanding Rookie Award – Harold Hallman (DT), Calgary Stampeders
CFLPA's Outstanding Community Service Award – Tyrone Crews (LB), BC Lions
CFL's Coach of the Year – Al Bruno, Hamilton Tiger-Cats

References 

CFL
Canadian Football League seasons